Malwa may refer to 

 Malwa culture  a chalcolithic culture based in Malwa

It may also refer to the following entities in India :

 Central India
 Malwa, one of six historical regions of Hindustan that make up the modern Madhya Pradesh state
 Battle of Malwa, 1738, Mughal-Maratha 
 Malwa Express 
 Malwa (cattle), a zebu breed
 Malwa Agency, for British indirect rule
 Malwa Subah, Mughal imperial top-level province
 Malwa Sultanate
 Malwa Union
 Malwa Plateau

 elsewhere in India
 Malwa (Punjab), one of the three geographical regions that make up Punjab (India)